{{DISPLAYTITLE:Adenosine A2B receptor}}

The adenosine A2B receptor, also known as ADORA2B, is a G-protein coupled adenosine receptor, and also denotes the human adenosine A2b receptor gene which encodes it.

Mechanism
This integral membrane protein stimulates adenylate cyclase activity in the presence of adenosine. This protein also interacts with netrin-1, which is involved in axon elongation.

Gene
The gene is located near the Smith-Magenis syndrome region on chromosome 17.

Ligands
Research into selective A2B ligands has lagged somewhat behind the development of ligands for the other three adenosine receptor subtypes, but a number of A2B-selective compounds have now been developed, and research into their potential therapeutic applications is ongoing.

Agonists
 BAY 60-6583
 NECA (N-ethylcarboxamidoadenosine) 
 (S)-PHPNECA - high affinity and efficacy at A2B, but poor selectivity over other adenosine receptor subtypes
 LUF-5835
 LUF-5845 - partial agonist

Antagonists and inverse agonists
 Compound 38: antagonist, high affinity and good subtype selectivity
 ISAM-R56A: non-xanthinic high affinity selective antagonist (Ki: 1.50 nM)
 ISAM-140: non-xanthinic selective antagonist (Ki  = 3.49 nM).
 ISAM-R324A: Soluble and metabolically stable non-xanthinic selective antagonist (Ki  = 6.10 nM). 
 ATL-801
 CVT-6883
 MRS-1706
 MRS-1754 
 OSIP-339,391
 PSB-603: xanthinic antagonist
 PSB-0788: xanthinic antagonist
 PSB-1115: xanthinic antagonist
 PSB-1901: xanthinic antagonist with picomolar potency

References

Further reading

External links 
 
 

Adenosine receptors